Robert Fleming Blyth Shankly (25 February 1910 – 5 May 1982) was a professional football player and manager from the village of Glenbuck in Ayrshire, Scotland.  He was the elder brother to Bill Shankly the former Liverpool manager.

Bob Shankly is considered one of Dundee F.C. greatest managers for his achievements with the club and has been inducted into the club's Hall of Fame.

Playing career 
Shankly was one of five brothers who all played football professionally, including Bill who would become a Scottish international and manager of Liverpool. Bob began his career with junior club Auchinleck before moving to the local club Glenbuck Cherrypickers.

He then moved into the senior ranks with Alloa Athletic after being turned down by Ayr United, despite scoring a hat-trick of goals in a trial match. Shankly then played for English non-league team Tunbridge. He later played for Falkirk, although he had signed for Falkirk while unaware that Preston North End (where his brother Bill was then playing) wanted to sign him. He represented the Scottish League XI in 1937. Like many working class men from Ayrshire at the time, he began working life as a miner (as did all his brothers), combining this job with football on a part-time basis. He married in 1936 and had two children, John (who became a civil engineer, but was offered the chance to become a professional footballer himself) and Margaret.

Managerial career 
It was as a football club manager that Bob Shankly made his name. After retiring from playing, he had a spell as a coach of Stenhousemuir before managing Falkirk, Third Lanark, Dundee, Hibernian and Stirling Albion, where he eventually became a director. While manager of Dundee, he managed to guide his club to victory in the Scottish Football League championship of 1961–62, three points ahead of Rangers and to date the only time Dundee have won the league title. The following season, he guided Dundee to the semi-finals of the European Champions Cup, where they were defeated 5–2 on aggregate by AC Milan. Craig Brown later compared Shankly's achievements with Walter Smith, Jock Stein, Alex Ferguson and Jim McLean. Dundee made it to the 1964 Scottish Cup Final, but a Scottish Cup defeat by St Johnstone the following season prompted his departure.

Shankly resigned from Dundee in February 1965 to succeed Jock Stein as manager of Hibernian. Hibs reached a League Cup Final in April 1969, but lost heavily to Stein's Celtic. He temporarily retired and left Hibs later in 1969. He returned to football management with Stirling Albion, then became their general manager and a club director.

Personal life 
He survived a major car accident in 1975, in which he, Jock Stein and another friend were seriously injured. Bob died from a heart attack at an SFA meeting on 5 May 1982. He was 72 years old, and his death came just one year after that of his younger brother Bill, who had also died from a heart attack. A stand at Dens Park is named in Shankly's honour and he is a member of the Dundee hall of fame.

Achievements

As a player 
Falkirk

 Scottish League Second Division (1): 1935–36
 Stirlingshire Cup (2): 1934–35, 1938–39
 Falkirk Infirmary Shield (6): 1933–34, 1934–35, 1935–36, 1936–37, 1937–38, 1938–39
 Dewar Shield (1): 1938–39

As a manager 

Falkirk

 Stirlingshire Cup (2): 1950–51, 1951–52

Dundee

Scottish League First Division (1): 1961–62
Scottish Cup: Runners-up: 1963-64
European Cup: Semi-Finalist: 1962-63

Stirling Albion
 Stirlingshire Cup (1): 1971–72

As an individual 

 Dundee Hall of Fame

References

Further reading

1910 births
Footballers from East Ayrshire
1982 deaths
Scottish footballers
Scottish football managers
Scottish expatriate football managers
Alloa Athletic F.C. players
Falkirk F.C. players
Falkirk F.C. managers
Dundee F.C. managers
Hibernian F.C. managers
Stirling Albion F.C. managers
Third Lanark A.C. managers
Toronto City managers
Scottish Football League players
Scottish Football League representative players
Tunbridge Wells F.C. players
Auchinleck Talbot F.C. players
Scottish Football League managers
United Soccer Association coaches
Glenbuck Cherrypickers F.C. players
Association football forwards
Association football inside forwards
Association football wing halves
Scottish expatriate sportspeople in Canada
Expatriate soccer managers in Canada